Nabi Avcı (born 8 October 1953, in Demirköy, Pazaryeri, Bilecik, Turkey) is a Turkish academic, writer and politician who was formerly chief advisor to the Turkish Prime Minister Recep Tayyip Erdoğan.

Early years
Nabi Avcı was born to Abdullah Avcı and his wife Habibe. He graduated from Middle East Technical University's Faculty of Administrative science, and earned later his PhD in Communication science from Anadolu University. In 1974, Avcı entered Ministry of Culture as a clerk.

Career
During the foundation years of Anadolu University, he served as a lecturer at the Faculty of Communication science. Avcı was appointed advisor at the Ministry of National Education and to the Prime Minister. He worked also as program director at a television channel as well as newspaper columnist and advisor to editor-in-chief.

In 2000, he became a professor for Communication science at Istanbul Bilgi University. Avcı was appointed 2003 chief advisor to the Prime minister.

Nabi Avcı served as a board member of the Scientific and Technological Research Council of Turkey (TÜBİTAK) and chairman of the Turkey National Committee of UNESCO.

Politics 
Avcı was elected as a Member of Parliament for Eskişehir in the 2011 general election. On 24 January 2013, he was appointed Minister of National Education replacing Ömer Dinçer in the cabinet.

Family life
Avcı is married and has five children.

References 

1953 births
Living people
People from Pazaryeri
Middle East Technical University alumni
Anadolu University alumni
Academic staff of Anadolu University
Academic staff of Istanbul Bilgi University
Ministers of National Education of Turkey
Deputies of Eskişehir
Justice and Development Party (Turkey) politicians
Members of the 25th Parliament of Turkey
Members of the 24th Parliament of Turkey
Members of the 26th Parliament of Turkey
Members of the 63rd government of Turkey
Members of the 64th government of Turkey
Members of the 65th government of Turkey
Ministers of Culture and Tourism of Turkey